"Carlene" is a song co-written and recorded by American country music artist Phil Vassar.  It was released in October 1999 as Vassar's debut single, from his self-titled debut album (2000).  "Carlene" reached a peak of number 5 on the U.S. Billboard Hot Country Singles & Tracks charts and number 45 on the U.S. Billboard Hot 100, and it reached number 1 in Canada. The song was written by Vassar, Charlie Black and Rory Bourke.

Content
"Carlene" is a moderate up-tempo backed mainly by piano, played by Vassar. In the lyric, the narrator recalls a girl named Carlene with whom he went to high school. He recalls being an athlete who struggled with his academics, while she was the valedictorian. Now an adult, he visits the school yard, where he meets Carlene again. He tells her that she is "lookin' good". In the second verse, the two go out for a ride together and begin conversing. She reveals that she now has a Ph.D. and is modeling for Vogue, while he is a songwriter who "finally got a couple [songs] out on country radio". The single edit omits one repetition of the chorus at the end.

Collin Raye sings backing vocals on the song.

Music video
The music video was directed by Gerry Wenner, and premiered on CMT on October 29, 1999, when CMT named it a "Hot Shot". It features Vassar singing the song while playing the piano on a rooftop.

Critical reception
Country Standard Time critic George Hauenstein cited "Carlene" as a standout track on Vassar's debut album. He said that although the song did not have a traditional country music sound, it was a "fun, up-tempo song", and that it was more lyrically substantial than most other songs on the country radio at the time. Vince Ripol, reviewing the album for Allmusic, also described "Carlene" favorably, calling it "boisterous" and an "immediate hit", also saying that Vassar's songwriting style recalled Tom T. Hall's story songs.

Chart positions
"Carlene" debuted at number 74 on the U.S. Billboard Hot Country Singles & Tracks for the week of October 30, 1999. Although Vassar had written several singles for other singers since the mid-1990s, "Carlene" is his first release as a singer.

Year-end charts

References

1999 debut singles
1999 songs
Phil Vassar songs
Songs written by Charlie Black
Songs written by Rory Bourke
Songs written by Phil Vassar
Song recordings produced by Byron Gallimore
Arista Nashville singles